The George M. Kober Medal and Lectureship are two different awards by the Association of American Physicians (AAP) in honor of one of its early presidents, George M. Kober. The George M. Kober Lectureship, is an honor given to an AAP member "for outstanding research contributions which have extraordinary impact on patients"; beginning in 1925, the Lectureship has been awarded every three years. The George M. Kober Medal, started in 1927, has, beginning in 1929, been awarded annually (except for 1944 and 1946) to an AAP member "whose lifetime efforts have had an enormous impact ..."

Prize winners

George M. Kober Lectureship
 1925: John J. Abel, Baltimore
 1928: Simon Flexner, New York
 1931: Frederick George Novy, Ann Arbor
 1934: Walter B. Cannon, Boston
 1937: Ludvig Hektoen, Chicago
 1940: William George MacCallum, Baltimore
 1943: Eugene L. Opie, New York
 1946: Peyton Rous, New York
 1949: Homer F. Swift, New York
 1952: Arthur L. Bloomfield, San Francisco
 1955: James Howard Means, Boston
 1958: Homer W. Smith, New York
 1961: Rene J. Dubos, New York
 1964: Frank L. Horsfall, Jr., New York
 1967: Francis D. Lukens, Pittsburgh
 1970: Robert A. Good, Minneapolis
 1973: Lewis Thomas, New York
 1977: Arno G. Motulsky, Seattle
 1980: Grant W. Liddle, Nashville
 1982: Bengt Samuelsson, Stockholm
 1985: Oscar D. Ratnoff, Cleveland
 1988: Anthony S. Fauci, Bethesda
 1991: Philip W. Majerus, St. Louis
 1994: Bert Vogelstein, Baltimore
 1997: Mark Keating, Salt Lake City
 2000: Francis Collins, Bethesda
 2003: Stanley Korsmeyer, Boston
 2006: Robert Lefkowitz, Durham
 2009: Michael J. Welsh, Iowa City
 2012: Barry S. Coller, New York
 2015: P. Frederick Sparling, Chapel Hill
 2018: Helen H. Hobbs, Dallas
 2021: Jean Bennett, Pennsylvania

George M. Kober Medal 
 1927: Victor C. Vaughan and William H. Welch
 1929: George R. Minot
 1930: James B. Herrick
 1931: Henry Sewall
 1932: Elliott P. Joslin
 1933: Alfred N. Richards
 1934: John Jacob Abel
 1935: Frank B. Mallory
 1936: E. R. Baldwin
 1937: William H. Park
 1938: Rufus Cole
 1939: George H. Whipple
 1940: Frederick F. Russell
 1941: William de B. MacNider
 1942: Donald D. Van Slyke
 1943: Ernest W. Goodpasture
 1944: No award
 1945: Oswald T. Avery
 1946: No award
 1947: Eugene Floyd DuBois
 1948: Warfield T. Longcope
 1949: Alphonse R. Dochez
 1950: Edwards A. Park
 1951: James L. Gamble
 1952: Edward C. Kendall
 1953: Peyton Rous
 1954: Herbert S. Gasser
 1955: William C. Stadie
 1956: Stanley Cobb
 1957: Richard E. Shope
 1958: Arnold R. Rich
 1959: Robert F. Loeb
 1960: David Marine
 1961: Oswald Hope Robertson (1886–1966)
 1962: William Bosworth Castle
 1963: John R. Paul
 1964: J. Howard Means
 1965: Joseph T. Wearn
 1966: Joseph C. Aub
 1967: Isaac Starr
 1968: Tinsley R. Harrison
 1969: Dana W. Atchley
 1970: Dickinson W. Richards
 1971: W. Barry Wood, Jr.
 1972: Cecil J. Watson
 1973: Paul B. Beeson
 1974: Maxwell M. Wintrobe
 1975: Walsh McDermott
 1976: George W. Thorn
 1977: Robert H. Williams
 1978: Maxwell Finland
 1979: Franz J. Ingelfinger
 1980: Eugene A. Stead
 1981: A. McGehee Harvey
 1982: James A. Shannon
 1983: Lewis Thomas
 1984: Robert W. Berliner
 1985: Donald W. Seldin
 1986: Lloyd H. Smith, Jr.
 1987: Helen B. Taussig
 1988: Oscar D. Ratnoff
 1989: Maclyn McCarty
 1990: Victor A. McKusick
 1991: James B. Wyngaarden
 1992: E. Donnall Thomas
 1993: Arnold S. Relman
 1994: David M. Kipnis
 1995: Alexander Leaf
 1996: Robert Petersdorf
 1997: Helen Ranney
 1998: Eugene Braunwald
 1999: Jean Wilson
 2000: J. Claude Bennett
 2001: Kurt J. Isselbacher
 2002: Michael Stuart Brown, Joseph L. Goldstein
 2003: Leon E. Rosenberg
 2004: K. Frank Austen
 2005: William N. Kelley
 2006: David G. Nathan
 2007: Anthony Fauci
 2008: Samuel O. Thier
 2009: Francois Abboud
 2010: Stuart Kornfeld
 2011: Robert Lefkowitz
 2012: Arthur H. Rubenstein
 2013: John T. Potts, Jr.
 2014: Elizabeth G. Nabel
 2015: Francis Collins
 2016: Peter Agre
 2017: Laurie H. Glimcher
 2018: Stuart H. Orkin
 2019: C. Ronald Kahn
 2020: Michael J. Welsh
 2021: Jeffrey I. Gordon
 2022: Linda Fried

References

Awards established in 1925
American science and technology awards
Medicine awards
1925 establishments in the United States